Choi Ji-mook (born October 9, 1998) is a South Korean professional football defender currently playing for the Busan IPark of the K League 2.

Career statistics

Club

References

External links
 

1998 births
Living people
South Korean footballers
K League 1 players
Seongnam FC players
Association football defenders